The Mayor is the highest elected official in Tampa, Florida. Since its incorporation in 1856, the town has had 59 mayors. Tampa had no mayor from 1862 until 1866, during which time the city government was temporarily suspended during and immediately after the American Civil War.

Election process
In 1910, the white supremacist White Municipal Party was established in Tampa. It excluded African Americans from being members effectively excluding African American voters from having influence in the city's mayoral elections from 1910 until 1947.

Since 1953, Tampa's municipal elections (including those for mayor) have been non-partisan. All qualified candidates are entered into the general election without a primary election. Candidates are required to disclose a party affiliation. If no candidate wins a majority of the vote, a runoff election is held between the top two vote-getters to decide the final outcome.

Terms and term limits
From the establishment of Tampa's city charter of 1856 until 1896, Tampa's mayors served one year terms. The term was extended to two years in 1896 and to four years in 1924.

From 1856 until 1920, Tampa mayors could not serve consecutive terms but were permitted to run again after being out of office for one full term. This resulted in several mayors serving multiple non-consecutive terms, especially in the late 1800s. In 1920, term limits were abolished entirely.

Since 1983, Tampa mayors have been limited to two consecutive terms, but they may run again after spending at least a full four-year term out of the office.

List

Notes

† Deceased in office.
1 Following the lapse of the city charter on October 1869, Hillsborough County took over responsibility for providing principal services. However, Tampa needed some form of municipal government to monitor the services being provided by the county and the state. As a result, a municipal election was held on July 6, 1870 in which Henderson was elected mayor.''

See also
 Timeline of Tampa, Florida

References

External links
History of Tampa mayors

Tampa, Florida

History of Tampa, Florida
Mayors